L'Angoisse is a French play by Pierre Mills and Celia de Vilyars. The film rights to it were bought by Vernon Sewell who filmed it four times: The Medium (1934), Latin Quarter (1945), Ghost Ship (1952) and House of Mystery (1961).

References

French plays adapted into films